Shamsabad (also Romanized as Shamsābād; also known as Shams Abad Nogh) is a village in Rezvan Rural District, Ferdows District, Rafsanjan County, Kerman Province, Iran. At the 2006 census, its population was 661, in 171 families.

References 

Populated places in Rafsanjan County